The Greek Fertilizers and Chemicals ELFE SA ( ELFE Α.Β.Ε.Ε.) is a fertilizer company operating in Greece. The company's offices are located in Athens.

The Phosphate Fertilizer Industry was established in 1961 as a subsidiary of the Emporiki Bank Group of Greece. The fertilizer factory southwest of Nea Karvali began operations in 1965. Then, in 2000, a merger of the company with the company Chemical Industries of Northern Greece SA was carried out. The merged entity was acquired in 2009 by ELFE SA and has since been named the Greek Fertilizers and Chemicals ELFE SA (Greek ELFE Fertilizers).

The fertilizer factory is located southwest of Nea Karvali, in Kavala, near the commercial port of Philip II.

References

External links

Manufacturing companies established in 1961
Companies based in Athens
Greek brands
Chemical companies of Greece
Greek companies established in 1961